The following lists events that happened during 1978 in New Zealand.

Population
 Estimated population as of 31 December: 3,165,200
 Decrease since 31 December 1977: 1,200 (0.04%)
 Males per 100 females: 99.2
 This was the first year since 1941 in which New Zealand's population declined (due to emigration, largely to Australia).

Incumbents

Regal and viceregal
Head of State – Elizabeth II
Governor-General – The Rt Hon. Sir Keith Holyoake KG GCMG CH QSO.

Government
Speaker of the House – Richard Harrison.
Prime Minister – Robert Muldoon
Deputy Prime Minister – Brian Talboys.
Minister of Finance – Robert Muldoon.
Minister of Foreign Affairs – Brian Talboys.
Attorney-General – Peter Wilkinson until 13 December, then Jim McLay.
Chief Justice — Sir Richard Wild (until 20 January), Sir Ronald Davison (starting 3 February)

Parliamentary opposition
 Leader of the Opposition –  Bill Rowling (Labour).
Social Credit Party – Bruce Beetham

Main centre leaders
Mayor of Auckland – Dove-Myer Robinson
Mayor of Hamilton – Ross Jansen
Mayor of Wellington – Michael Fowler
Mayor of Christchurch – Hamish Hay
Mayor of Dunedin – Clifford George (Cliff) Skeggs

Events
 The Pureora Forest Park was established after a series of protests and tree sittings.
 18 February – The Rangitikei by-election was won by Bruce Beetham for Social Credit.
 1 April – Flag carriers Air New Zealand and the National Airways Corporation merge to form a single airline under the Air New Zealand name.
 12 September – Kaimai Rail Tunnel on the East Coast Main Trunk Railway, at 8896 m the longest tunnel in New Zealand, opened.
 December – Holy Name Seminary, Christchurch (Catholic) closed.

Arts and literature
Roger Hall and Peter Olds win the Robert Burns Fellowship.

See 1978 in art, 1978 in literature, :Category:1978 books

January
 Nambassa, three-day music, crafts and alternative lifestyles festival on Phil and Pat Hulses'  farm in Golden Valley, north of Waihi. Attendance 25,000.

October
 Nambassa winter road show, toured the North Island of NZ, promoting the 1979 festival.

Music

New Zealand Music Awards
Winners were as follows: 
ALBUM OF THE YEAR  Hello Sailor – Hello Sailor
SINGLE OF THE YEAR  Golden Harvest – I Need Your Love
TOP MALE VOCALIST  John Rowles
TOP GROUP  Hello Sailor
TOP FEMALE VOCALIST  Sharon O’Neill
ENGINEER OF THE YEAR  Ian Morris – Hello Sailor
PRODUCER OF THE YEAR  Rob Aicken – Hello Sailor
MOST PROMISING GROUP  Citizen Band
MOST PROMISING FEMALE VOCALIST  Kim Hart
MOST PROMISING MALE VOCALIST  Dennis O’Brien

See: 1978 in music

Performing arts

 Benny Award presented by the Variety Artists Club of New Zealand to George Tumahai.

Radio and television
23 November – the AM broadcast band moves from 10 kHz spacing to 9 kHz spacing.
Feltex Television Awards:
Best Current Affairs: Dateline Monday
Best Information: Fair Go
Best Documentary: Birth with R.D. Laing
Best Light Entertainment: A Week of It
Best Drama: The Governor
Best Speciality: Sport on One
Best Actor: David McPhail on A Week of It
Best Personality: Roger Gascoigne
Best Script: He Iwi Ko Tahi Tatou: episode four of The Governor

See: 1978 in New Zealand television, 1978 in television, List of TVNZ television programming, :Category:Television in New Zealand, :Category:New Zealand television shows, Public broadcasting in New Zealand

Film
Angel Mine
Skin Deep

See: :Category:1978 film awards, 1978 in film, List of New Zealand feature films, Cinema of New Zealand, :Category:1978 films

Sport

Athletics
 Paul Ballinger wins his first national title in the men's marathon, clocking 2:17:33 on 11 March in Hastings.

Chess
 The 85th New Zealand Chess Championship is held in Wellington, and is won by Craig Laird of Tauranga.

Commonwealth Games

Cricket
 15 February: After 48 years of trying, New Zealand beats England in a Test match for the first time, winning the Test at the Basin Reserve.

Horse racing

Harness racing
 New Zealand Trotting Cup: Trusty Scot
 Auckland Trotting Cup: Sole Command. From 1978–86 the race was over 2700m and there was no handicapping.

Soccer
 New Zealand National Soccer League won by Christchurch United
 The Chatham Cup is won by Manurewa who beat Nelson United 1–0 in the final.

Births
 2 January: Dan Ward-Smith, rugby union player 
 5 January: Adi Dick, musician.
 21 January (in the United States): Mike Chappell, basketballer.
 3 February: Keith Cameron, rugby union player.
 26 February: Rico Gear, rugby union player.
 8 April: Nathan Mauger, rugby union player.
 29 April: Donna Loffhagen, netball and basketball player.
 19 May: Willie Walker, rugby union player.
 28 May: John Dennison, poet.
 1 June: Ben Lummis, singer and winner of New Zealand Idol (season 1).
 11 June: Daryl Tuffey, cricketer.
 4 July: Bianca Russell, field hockey player.
 6 July: Kevin Senio, rugby union player.
 12 July: Claire Chitham, actor.
 26 July: David Kosoof, field hockey player.
 28 July: Jacob Oram, cricketer.
 14 August (in South Africa): Greg Rawlinson, rugby union player.
 5 September:
 Chris Hipkins, politician.
 Chris Jack, rugby union player.
 10 September: Nish Selvadurai, comedian.
 13 September: Andrew Hore, rugby union player.
 18 September: Iain Lees-Galloway, politician.
 21 September: Doug Howlett, rugby union player.
 10 October: Caroline and Georgina Evers-Swindell (twins), rowers, Olympic gold medallists (2004 Athens and 2008 Beijing)
 26 October: Ricky Cockerill, figure skater.
 6 November: Dean Kent, swimmer.
 11 November: Lou Vincent, cricketer.
 19 November (in Australia): Mahé Drysdale, rower, Olympic gold medallist (2012 London)
 21 November: Paul Urlovic, soccer player.
 William Dwane Bell, convicted murderer.
 Mok TzeMing, writer.
:Category:1978 births

Deaths
 6 January: Burt Munro, record-setting motorcyclist
 30 March: Sir Charles William Hamilton (Bill Hamilton), inventor of the jetboat.
 13 May: Alby Roberts, cricketer.
 22 May: Sir Richard Wild, 9th Chief Justice of New Zealand.
 23 July: Sir Ronald Algie, politician and former Speaker of the House of Representatives.
 18 August: Ronald L. Meek, economist.
 John Hutton, glass engraver
:Category:1978 deaths

See also
List of years in New Zealand
Timeline of New Zealand history
History of New Zealand
Military history of New Zealand
Timeline of the New Zealand environment
Timeline of New Zealand's links with Antarctica

References

External links

 
New Zealand
Years of the 20th century in New Zealand